The San Cristóbal to Tucumán Railway (in Spanish: Ferrocarril San Cristóbal a Tucumán) was a French-owned railway company founded in 1888 which built a  railway from San Cristóbal to Tucumán in Argentina.

History 
Originally granted in concession to Portalis frères, Charbonnier & Co. on October 21, 1887, it was transferred to Fives-Lille company one year later and transferred again to "Compagnie française des Chemins de Fer en Argentine" (colloquially known as La Francesa) in July 1889, which finally built the rail line.

The section from San Cristóbal in Santa Fe Province to Fortín Inca, just over the border in Santiago del Estero Province, was opened on 27 April 1891. From there construction continued across the province and into neighbouring Tucumán Province where San Miguel de Tucumán, the provincial capital, was reached on 6 July 1892. A 13-km branch line from Colombres to Guzmán and another from Pacará to Rio Salí were opened later the same year.

In 1896 the company was bought by the state and became part of Central Northern Railway.

See also 
 Central Northern Railway
 Belgrano Railway

References 

 

s
s
s
s
Rail transport in Santa Fe Province
Transport in Tucumán Province
Transport in Santiago del Estero Province